Isolabella is a comune (municipality) in the Metropolitan City of Turin in the Italian region Piedmont, located about  southeast of Turin. 
 
Isolabella borders the following municipalities: Villanova d'Asti, Poirino, Valfenera and Cellarengo.

References

Cities and towns in Piedmont